John More may refer to:

Politicians
John More (died 1620), MP for Winchester and Portsmouth
John More (died 1638) (1578–1638), MP for Lymington in 1624 and 1626
John More (MP for Cumberland) (fl. 1404), MP for Cumberland
John More (MP for Barnstaple) (fl. 1421–23), MP for Barnstaple
John More (by 1506–81), MP for Winchelsea
John More (c. 1520 – c. 1576), MP for West Looe and Dartmouth
John More (MP for Ipswich) (died 1588), MP for Ipswich
John More (died 1583), MP for Worcester
John T. More (1771–1857), political figure in Roxbury, NY and the state of New York

Others
John More (judge) (c.1451-1530), judge
John More, grandson of the judge and son of Thomas More
John More (minister) (died 1592), English clergyman
John Shank More (1784–1861), chair of Scots law at the University of Edinburgh
Major John More, drew up the Uqair Protocol of 1922

See also
John Moore (disambiguation)